This is list of 49er class sailors at the Summer Olympics.

2000 Sydney

2004 Athens

2008 Beijing

2012 London

 
49er class Olympic
Sailors, 49er class